Lincoln Crowley is an Australian lawyer, who was sworn in a judge of the Supreme Court of Queensland on 13 June 2022, becoming the first Indigenous Australian to be appointed as a State or Territory justice.

Justice Crowley grew up in Charters Towers, Queensland, attending high school there in the 1980's. His father was one of the Australian Defense Force's first Indigenous majors. Crowley studied at James Cook University, graduating in 1996 with a Bachelor of Laws, and in 1999 was awarded a Graduate Diploma of Legal Practice from Queensland University of Technology.

Admitted to the legal profession in both Queensland and New South Wales, Justice Crowley became a barrister on 10 August 2007, and took silk (appointed Queen's Counsel) on 22 November 2018.

References 

Living people
People from Queensland
Australian King's Counsel
Year of birth missing (living people)